Melissa Ashley (born 1973) is an Australian novelist. In the 2017 Queensland Literary Awards, her novel The Birdman's Wife won the University of Queensland Fiction Book Award. It also received the Australian Booksellers Association Nielsen BookData 2017 Booksellers Choice Award.

Biography 
Ashley was born 1973 in Christchurch, New Zealand and arrived in Australia aged eight. Ashley has two children and is a self-confessed committed "twitcher".

Ashley's interest in birds motivated her 2016 historical novel The Birdman's Wife, about Elizabeth Gould who illustrated and drew specimens of birds for her husband John Gould's various books on birds. Ashley wrote the novel as part of her PhD whilst studying at the University of Queensland.

The Bee and the Orange Tree was shortlisted for the 2020 Davitt Award for best debut crime book.

At the 2022 Queensland Literary Awards, Ashley was awarded a Queensland Writers Fellowship valued at $15,000.

Works 
 
 
  (M.Phil Thesis)

References

External links
 Author's website

1973 births
Living people
Australian women novelists
Australian historical novelists